The Laos warty newt (Laotriton laoensis) is a species of salamander in the family Salamandridae. It is found only in the Saysomboun Special Zone and Phou Kout District in Xiangkhouang Province, Laos. Its natural habitats are subtropical or tropical dry shrubland and rivers. In 2014, it is classed as Endangered.

Sometimes this newt is classified as Paramesotriton laoensis.

Since 1999, the population of this newt in the wild has been decimated by wildlife trading networks.

References

External links
Pictures
Picture
Laotriton laoensis feeding
Salamanders of the Old World - Laotriton laoensis
The dark side of new species discovery

Newts
Endemic fauna of Laos
Amphibians of Laos
Endangered fauna of Asia
Amphibians described in 2002
Taxa named by Bryan Lynn Stuart
Taxa named by Theodore Johnstone Papenfuss
Taxonomy articles created by Polbot